Porter Corners, New York is a hamlet in the town of Greenfield, Saratoga County, New York, United States. It was once known as Porter's Corners.

It is mainly known for the Brookhaven Golf Course within it.  

Hamlets in New York (state)
Hamlets in Saratoga County, New York